The Three Brothers are three erratic boulders or standing stone hilltop altars located in the hills above Morecambe Bay, immediately north of Warton Crag. The site was surveyed by Alexander Thom.  It is accessible along a footpath through woodland.

Notes

Megalithic monuments in England
Stone Age sites in England
Archaeological sites in Lancashire
Buildings and structures in the City of Lancaster
Tourist attractions in Lancashire